Mount Rogers, is a  massif located in Glacier National Park in the Selkirk Mountains of British Columbia, Canada. Mount Rogers is situated at the north end of the Hermit Range, and is the highest point of the range. Its nearest higher peak is Mount Sir Donald,  to the southeast. The peak is prominently visible from eastbound Highway 1, the Trans-Canada Highway at Rogers Pass. The Rogers massif includes five individually-named summits: Rogers Peak, Grant Peak, Fleming Peak, Swiss Peak, and Truda Peaks. Numerous glaciers radiate from all sides, including the Rogers Glacier, Swiss Glacier, Tupper Glacier, and Hermit Glacier.

History
Mount Rogers was named after Major A.B. Rogers, an American surveyor working for the Canadian Pacific Railway, and the discoverer of Rogers Pass.

The first ascent of the mountain was made on July 31, 1896 by Phillip S. Abbott, George T. Little, and Charles S. Thompson.

The mountain's name was officially adopted in 1932 when approved by the Geographical Names Board of Canada.

Climate
Based on the Köppen climate classification, Mount Rogers has a subarctic climate with cold, snowy winters, and mild summers. Winter temperatures can drop below −20 °C with wind chill factors below −30 °C. Precipitation runoff from the mountain drains into tributaries of the Beaver River.

See also

 Geography of British Columbia
 Geology of British Columbia

References

External links
 Weather forecast: Mount Rogers
 Mt. Rogers photo: Flickr

Three-thousanders of British Columbia
Selkirk Mountains
Kootenay Land District